ARAG Tower  is a 31-storey,  office skyscraper, in the northern district of Mörsenbroich, Düsseldorf, Germany. The tower is the tallest building in Düsseldorf, and it serves as headquarters for the leading legal insurer worldwide, the ARAG Group.  

The architect firms of Foster + Partners and Rhode Kellermann Wawrowsky collaborated on the project, and Hochtief project management. Construction took place between 1998 and 2001 with the final cost of the building being €46 million.

References

 Site of Hochtief, construction company

Buildings and structures in Düsseldorf
Foster and Partners buildings
Skyscrapers in Düsseldorf
Skyscraper office buildings in Germany
Office buildings completed in 2001